Huqoq or Hukkok was an ancient Jewish village, located 12.5 km north of Tiberias. 
The area had been settled since ancient times and is mentioned in the Book of Joshua. The Palestinian village Yaquq was built at Huqoq's location, and a kibbutz named Hukok was established near the site on 11 July 1945.

History

Name evolution
The Canaanites called it Hukkok, and during the Roman period it was known as Hucuca. The name of the Arab village at the presumed site of biblical Hukkok was Yaquq.

Archaeological and historical periods
Archaeological investigations at the site of the former village of Yaquq, located near the Sea of Galilee, 12.5 km north of Tiberias, uphill from Capernaum and Magdala, suggest that the site was inhabited in the Iron Age, Persian, Hellenistic, Roman, Byzantine, Abbasid, Fatimid, Mamluk and Ottoman periods. The Arab village of Yakuk was abandoned during the 1948 war and was bulldozed in 1968.

In the Hebrew Bible (Book of Joshua)
The International Standard Bible Encyclopaedia considers the identification of Hukkok with Yakuk as plausible, although it might be too far from Aznoth-tabor (possibly Khirbet el-Jebeil, c. 3 miles north of Mout Tabor) to fit the description.

Bronze Age
The village site was inhabited in the Early and Middle Bronze Age.

Roman and Byzantine periods
The Roman period village was large and prosperous due to the presence of a constant spring. It is apparent from both the synagogue and the absence of pig bones that the Roman period village was Jewish.

The village is attested in Late Roman and Byzantine period rabbinic sources.

Ottoman period

The prosperity of the ancient village contrasts with the simplicity of the Ottoman-era settlement and can be seen by archaeologists in animal bones which were cut by professional butchers in the ancient Jewish village, and by farmers in the Muslim period.

Archaeology
A 2011 dig led by archaeologist Jodi Magness excavated several sections at the site of the former village. 

"The ancient village is surrounded by associated features, including cist graves, rock-cut tombs, a mausoleum, quarries, agricultural terraces and installations, a winepress and an olive press. Two large miqwa'ot (ritual baths) are hewn into bedrock on the eastern and southern periphery of the ancient village (see below)."

Ancient synagogue
Among the structures uncovered during the 2012 dig were the remains of an elaborate synagogue, dated to the 5th century. Findings include limestone carvings and an elaborate floor mosaic. The synagogue's walls and columns were painted in bright colors: plaster fragments show traces of pink, red, orange and white pigments. The artistry of the mosaic, which is composed of tiny tiles, together with the large stones used for the walls, attests to the prosperity of the village.

Mosaic iconography
The mosaic includes of the Biblical hero Samson. The figure of Samson appears twice: carrying the gates of Gaza, and tying burning torches to the tails of foxes. Samson and the foxes is an episode from the Book of Judges. During a battle with the Philistines, Samson catches 300 wild foxes, ties burning torches to their tails and sets them loose to set fire to Philistine grain fields.

According to archaeologist Jodi Magness, the discovery is significant because "only a small number of ancient (Late Roman) synagogue buildings are decorated with mosaics showing biblical scenes, and only two others have scenes with Samson (one is at another site just a couple of miles from Huqoq)." 

The mosaic also shows two human faces, apparently female, flanking a Hebrew inscription promising a reward to those who perform good deeds. In 2018, photographs of newly discovered mosaics were published in conjunction with a 70-page interim report of the excavations from 2014–2017. The new publication shows that the floor mosaic also  depicts Noah's Ark, the twelve Israelite spies, and Moses' parting of the Red Sea, themes that are rarely, if ever, found in synagogues of the time. Other images show Jonah being swallowed by the fish and the building of the Tower of Babel. The mosaic also incorporates pagan Hellenistic images such as cupids and theatre masks, and an obscure cluster of important looking men, one of whom may be Alexander the Great, next to soldiers and war elephants. If Magness' theory is correct, this would be the only case of a synagogue being decorated with non-Biblical imagery. Another theory is that the two groups, one dressed in armour and the other in white robes, represent the alliance between the Seleucids and the high priest John Hyrcanus.

Tomb of Habakkuk

Jewish, Christian, Druze and Muslim tradition located the tomb of the prophet Habakkuk in Huqoq and it has been a site of pilgrimage since the twelfth century. The earliest mention of the tomb is a letter written by Rabbi Samuel ben Samson in 1210: "On our way back from Tiberias we went on to Kefar Hanan. In journeying there we came across the tomb of Habakkuk in Kefar Hukkok." In 1215 Menahem ben Perez of Hebron visited the site and wrote: "And I went from there, and saw the tomb of the prophet Habakkuk near a spring." The earliest detailed description appears in the book "These are the Travels" (1270–1291): "From there one goes to Ya‘aquq, where is the grave of the prophet Habakkuk, upon which there is a fine monument between four party walls."

An Englishmen named John Sanderson visited the tomb in 1601 and wrote "Then we passed by a little village where dwelt and is buried the prophet Abicoke; so said the Jews, and that the town was called Yeacoke."

A description from the 1930s states that "The tombstone. . . is built of basalt stones, about two metres wide and
1.5 metres long, covered in white plaster".

In 1981 the old tombstone was replaced by a new one, over which a small building was erected, along with a pool filled by spring water and meant to be used as a ritual bath. Jewish and Druze pilgrims continue to visit the tomb.

Seffi Ben Yosef, a local tour guide,  questioned the tradition in an editorial in Ynet News, arguing that the tradition was only based on the similar-sounding name between the village and the prophet.

References

Bibliography

 

Magness, Jodi:  “Samson in the Synagogue,” Biblical Archaeology Review 39.1 (2013), pp. 32–39, 66-67.
 Magness, Jodi: October 2013, Scholar’s Update: New Mosaics from the Huqoq Synagogue,   BAS LIBRARY

External links
Huqoq Excavation Project Official site

Archaeological sites in Israel
Ancient villages in Israel
Hebrew Bible places
Israeli mosaics